Catopta sikkimensis is a moth in the family Cossidae. It was described by G.S. Arora in 1965. It is found in Sikkim, India.

References

Moths described in 1965
Catoptinae